Chaos Magick is the second studio album by Finnish black metal band Saturnian Mist. It was recorded at the Blackvox Studio at Tampere, Finland in April–September 2014 and mastered at the Turan Audio in Oxford, UK by Tim Turan in October 2014.

Two music videos were made from the album, both directed and edited by fra. Zetekh. First one "The True Law" was released also as a single in December 2014 and the second music video was from the track "Bloodsoaked Chakrament".

CD version was released by Candlelight Records on April 27, 2015 and the vinyl version was released by Saturnal Records. Vinyl version does not include the track "Yoga, Hate, Fuck".

Track listing
All lyrics written by fra. Zetekh except "Martial Theosis" by IC Rex and "White Void Of All-Being" by fra. Zetekh & Johannes Nefastos. All music written by Saturnian Mist

Personnel

 Saturnian Mist
 fra. Zetekh - Vocals
 fra. Chaoswind - Lead & solo guitars
 fra. Ptahaz - Rhythm guitars
 fra. Macabrum - Bass guitars
 fra. Psychonaught - Percussions, synths & backing vocals
 fra. Vile - Drums

 Guest writers
 Johannes Nefastos (Lyrics for "White Void Of All-Being")
 IC Rex (Lyrics for "Martial Theosis)

 Production
 fra. Zetekh - Producing, Sound engineering, mixing, Cover layout
 fra. Ptahaz - Sound engineering
 Tim Turan - Mastering
 Vesa-Antti Puumalainen - Cover art
 Kristiina Lehto - Photography

References

External links

 Official website

2015 albums
Saturnian Mist albums